The 1986 Torneo Godó or Trofeo Conde de Godó was a men's tennis tournament that took place on outdoor clay courts at the Real Club de Tenis Barcelona in Barcelona, Catalonia in Spain. It was the 34th edition of the tournament and was part of the 1986 Grand Prix circuit. It was held from 22 September until 28 September 1986. Ninth-seeded Kent Carlsson won the singles title.

Finals

Singles
 Kent Carlsson defeated  Andreas Maurer 6–2, 6–2, 6–0
 It was Carlsson's 2nd singles title of the year and of his career.

Doubles
 Jan Gunnarsson /  Joakim Nyström defeated  Carlos di Laura /  Claudio Panatta 6–3, 6–4

References

External links
 Official tournament website
 ITF tournament edition details
 ATP tournament profile

Barcelona Open (tennis)
Torneo Godo
Torneo Godó
Torneo Godó